This is a list of valleys in Italy.

Valleys
Brenta Valley
Casentio
Fassa Valley
Itria Valley
Latin Valley
Mugello region 
Occitan Valleys
Ossola
Valle Peligna 
Piscinamanna
Po Valley
Susa Valley
Val Taleggio
Val Bregaglia 
Val Camonica
Val d'Orcia 
Val di Merse
Val Ferret 
Val Rendena
Valassina
Valdigne
Valle del Belice 
Valle Spluga 
Valpelline
Sarntal
Val Adige
Valtellina
Valtorta 
Val Veny
 

Italy
Valleys